There is a small community of Mongolians in Japan, representing a minor portion of emigration from Mongolia. As of June 2021, there were 12,976 registered Mongolian citizens residing in Japan, according to the Ministry of Foreign Affairs, up from 2,545 in 2003.

Students
International students form a large proportion of the registered population of Mongolians in Japan. The earliest Mongol exchange students, all three of them women, came to Japan in 1906, when Mongolia was still ruled by the Qing Dynasty. Japan was also a popular destination for students from Mengjiang (in today's Inner Mongolia) in the late 1930s and early 1940s; among them were several who would go on to become famous scholars, such as Chinggeltei. Japan and the Mongolian People's Republic officially agreed to send exchange students to each other in 1974; the first Mongolian student to arrive under the agreement came in 1976. , 1,006 Mongolian students were studying in Japanese institutions of higher education.

Aside from Mongolian citizens, there were also estimated to be roughly 4,000 members of the Mongolian minority of China residing in Japan . Like migrants from Mongolia proper, they also came mostly on student visas, beginning in the 1990s; they were sponsored by professors of Mongolian studies at Japanese universities. They are a close-knit community; they reside mostly in the Nerima and Sugamo areas of Tokyo and in many cases the same apartment has been occupied serially by successive migrants for more than a decade, with each passing the lease on to another migrant before leaving the country or moving on to different accommodation.

Sumo wrestlers

In a 2009 survey conducted by a Japanese statistical agency, of the four sumo wrestlers named as most famous by Japanese people, three were Mongolian.

Notable people

 Asashōryū Akinori, originally Dolgorsuren Dagvadorj, sumo wrestler
 Hakuhō Shō, originally Mönkhbatyn Davaajargal, sumo wrestler
 Kyokutenhō Masaru, originally Tsebeknyam Nyamjyab, sumo wrestler
 Kyokutenzan Takeshi, originally Enkhbat Batmunkh, sumo wrestler
 Harumafuji Kōhei, originally Davaanyamyn Byambadorj, sumo wrestler

See also
 Japan–Mongolia relations
 Mongol invasions of Japan

References

External links
 Mongolian Association in Japan
 Япон дахь Монгол Оюутны Холбоо (Union of Mongolian Students in Japan)

Mongolians
 
 
Japan